Kalateh-ye Baluch or Kalateh-ye Baluch may refer to:
 Kalateh-ye Baluch, Darmian
 Kalateh-ye Boluch, Sarbisheh